John Anders Bjørkøy (born 8 January 1979) is a retired Norwegian footballer. He was an industrious midfielder, but also played in either full-back position. He is the son of Norwegian tenor Svein Bjørkøy.

Club career
He came to Fredrikstad from Hønefoss BK in the Norwegian First Division July 2005. He made his debut against Lyn on 24 July 2005. Bjørkøy was one of the most consistent players in the team over the last years. He was selected to be Fredrikstad's captain in 2006.

International career
His solid performances and good progression has given him a chance to play for the Norwegian national team. His first international match was against Croatia on 6 February 2007. He earned four caps.

References

External links
 
 
 
 

1979 births
Living people
Norwegian footballers
Norway international footballers
Skjetten SK players
Raufoss IL players
Norwegian First Division players
Hønefoss BK players
Fredrikstad FK players
Lillestrøm SK players
Odds BK players
Eliteserien players
People from Akershus
Association football midfielders
Sportspeople from Viken (county)